Strategic foresight is a planning-oriented discipline related to futures studies. In a business context, a more action-oriented approach has become well known as corporate foresight.

Definition and idea
Strategy is a high level plan to achieve one or more goals under conditions of uncertainty. Strategic foresight happens when any planner uses scanned inputs, forecasts, alternative futures exploration, analysis and feedback to produce or alter plans and actions of the organization. Scenario planning plays a prominent role in strategic foresight. The flowchart to the right provides a process for classifying a phenomenon as a scenario in the intuitive logics tradition and differentiates it from many other techniques and approaches to planning.

Strategic planning always includes analysis, but it may or may not involve serious foresight on the way to developing a plan, or taking an action. A consideration of possible futures (alternative futures) and of probable futures (forecasts, predictions) is important to developing a preferred future (plan), even the simple mental plans made prior to taking an action. It is the job of the strategic foresight professional to make sure appropriately diverse and relevant inputs, forecasts, and alternatives are considered in the analysis, decision making and planning processes, that plans are appropriately communicated and that when actions are taken, appropriate feedback occurs and after action reviews take place to improve the foresight process.

Strategic foresight is a growing practice in corporate foresight in large companies. Its use is also growing in government and non-profit organisations. In recent years, researchers and managers have also elaborated more on the links between foresight and innovation management.

Strategic foresight can be practiced at multiple levels, including:
Personal – "Personal and professional goal-setting and action planning"
Organizational – "Carrying out tomorrows' business better"
Social – "Moving toward the next civilisation – the one that lies beyond the current hegemony of techno/industrial/capitalist interests"

Quotes
"Strategic foresight is the ability to create and maintain a high-quality, coherent and functional forward view, and to use the insights arising in useful organisational ways. For example to detect adverse conditions, guide policy, shape strategy, and to explore new markets, products and services. It represents a fusion of futures methods with those of strategic management" (R. Slaughter (1999), p. 287).
"To manage ones expectations according to what is most predictable,act within reason, time is the measure of the function of all things that can be considered equally as important." Curtis Carpenter. Aphorism.

See also
Chain-linked model
Corporate foresight
Critical design
Design fiction
Forecasting
Foresight (future studies)
Futurology
Optimism bias
Reference class forecasting
Science fiction prototyping
Strategic Foresight Group
Technology forecasting
Technology scouting

References

Scientific journals 
 Technological Forecasting and Social Change
 Futures
 Futures & Foresight Science
 Foresight
 Journal of Futures Studies
European Journal of Futures Research

Conferences
 European Conference on Strategic Foresight

Foresight (futures studies)
Innovation
Strategy